Kohler Head is a small headland on the northeast side of Whitmer Peninsula, on the coast of Victoria Land, Antarctica. It was mapped by the United States Geological Survey from surveys and U.S. Navy air photos, 1957–62. The Advisory Committee on Antarctic Names named the headland after John L. Kohler, U.S. Navy, a construction electrician at McMurdo Station, 1965–66 and 1966–67.

References

Headlands of Victoria Land
Scott Coast